Luis Romano Peris Belmonte (born 7 June 1954), known by his stage name Gary Low, is an Italian singer. He recorded several musical works in both English and Spanish. His recording of "I Want You" is prominently sampled on Washed Out's "Feel It All Around", used as the opening theme song of the television series Portlandia.

Discography

Albums 

 Go On (1983)
 La Colegiala (1984)
 Grandes Éxitos (1984)
 Rien Ne Va Plus (1985)

Compilation albums
The Best Of (1993), Unidisc (Canada release)
I Want You – The Best of Gary Low (1994), Twilight Music (U.S. release)

Extended plays
 Gary Low's Summer (1984)

Singles

See also 

 List of Italian musicians
 List of Italo disco artists and songs
 List of people from Rome
 Music in Rome

References

External links 

 
 

1954 births
20th-century Italian male singers
English-language singers from Italy
Italian Italo disco musicians
Singers from Rome
Living people
Spanish-language singers of Italy